Timothy Allen Garrison (born 1976) is an American lawyer who served as the United States Attorney for the Western District of Missouri from 2018 to 2021.

Education 
Garrison earned a Bachelor of Science from Drury University, and a Master of Public Administration and Juris Doctor from the University of Missouri. He graduated from the Marine Corps Officer Candidates School in 2003. He is also a graduate of the Marine Corps University Expeditionary Warfare School and Command and Staff College.

Legal career and military prosecutor 
Before becoming a federal prosecutor, Garrison was a prosecutor in the United States Marine Corps. He also received the United States Army Judge Advocate General School's trial advocacy award. Now a lieutenant colonel in the Marine Corps Reserve, Garrison served as Deputy Legal Counsel in the Office of the Chairman of the Joint Chiefs of Staff at The Pentagon.

From 2007 to 2018, he served as an Assistant United States Attorney in the Western District of Missouri, prosecuting interstate and international drug trafficking, money laundering, murder, and other offenses. He is a recipient of the Missouri Bar Foundation award for appellate advocacy before the United States Court of Appeals for the Eighth Circuit.

U.S. Attorney 
On February 16, 2018, President Donald Trump announced his intent to nominate Garrison to be the U.S. Attorney for the Western District of Missouri. On February 27, 2018, his nomination was sent to the Senate. On April 26, 2018, his nomination was confirmed by voice vote.

On February 8, 2021, he along with 55 other U.S. attorneys were asked to resign. On February 11, 2021. Garrison announced his  resignation, effective February 28, 2021.

References

1976 births
Living people
United States Attorneys for the Western District of Missouri
Assistant United States Attorneys
Drury University alumni
People from Urbana, Illinois
University of Missouri School of Law alumni
United States Marines
University of Missouri alumni
21st-century American lawyers
United States Marine Corps reservists